Dream Castle is a 1933 comedy film directed by Géza von Bolváry and starring Edith Méra, Lucien Baroux, and Danielle Darrieux. It was produced in Berlin as the French-language version of The Castle in the South and released by UFA's French subsidiary.

The film's sets were designed by the art director Emil Hasler.

Cast

References

Bibliography

External links 
 

1933 films
German comedy films
1933 comedy films
1930s French-language films
Films directed by Géza von Bolváry
UFA GmbH films
German multilingual films
Films about filmmaking
German black-and-white films
1933 multilingual films
Films with screenplays by Henri-Georges Clouzot
1930s German films